Thuridilla decorata  is a species of sacoglossan sea slug, a shell-less marine opisthobranch gastropod mollusk in the family Plakobranchidae.

Distribution 
This species occurs in both the Gulf of Oman and the Red Sea.

References

External links 

 Sea Slug Forum info

Plakobranchidae
Gastropods described in 1983